Tadeusz Chudzyński is a paralympic athlete from Poland competing mainly in category T20 1500m events.

Tadeusz competed at the 2000 Summer Paralympics in Sydney, Australia there he competed in the 1500m for intellectually disabled athletes winning the bronze medal.

References

External links
 

Living people
Place of birth missing (living people)
Year of birth missing (living people)
Polish male middle-distance runners
Paralympic athletes of Poland
Paralympic bronze medalists for Poland
Paralympic medalists in athletics (track and field)
Athletes (track and field) at the 2000 Summer Paralympics
Medalists at the 2000 Summer Paralympics